Francis de Vries (born 28 November 1994) is a New Zealand professional footballer who plays for Allsvenskan club IFK Värnamo.

Club career
De Vries was initially scouted to attend the APFA Academy in Christchurch, New Zealand under the guidance of professional coaches Giovani Fernandes and Jess Ibrom.  The academy had a direct relationship with Chelsea FC as well as a number of professional clubs around the World including FC Basel in Switzerland. 
De Vries signed with local side Canterbury United, before getting the opportunity to sign a 6-month contract with FC Basel in 2012. Following his release by Basel, de Vries opted to move to the United States to play college soccer at Saint Francis University, where he played for four years and made 79 appearances, scoring 15 goals.

While at college, de Vries played with Premier Development League side Michigan Bucks.

On 13 January 2017, de Vries was selected in the second round (29th overall) of the 2017 MLS SuperDraft by Vancouver Whitecaps FC. He signed to Whitecaps FC 2 on 16 March 2017.

On 24 November 2017, de Vries signed with ISPS Handa Premiership side Canterbury United FC.

On 21 July 2018, de Vries signed with Nyköpings BIS in the Division 1 Norra.

In January 2019, de Vries joined Division 1 Södra side IFK Värnamo.

International career
Born in New Zealand, de Vries is of Dutch and Swiss descent. On 16 November 2021, de Vries made his international debut for New Zealand as a 95th minute substitute in a friendly match against The Gambia.

Honours
IFK Värnamo
 Superettan: 2021

References

External links 
 

1994 births
Living people
Association football defenders
New Zealand association footballers
New Zealand international footballers
New Zealand people of Dutch descent
New Zealand people of Swiss descent
Saint Francis Red Flash men's soccer players
Flint City Bucks players
Whitecaps FC 2 players
Expatriate soccer players in Canada
USL League Two players
USL Championship players
Vancouver Whitecaps FC draft picks
Association footballers from Christchurch